1,3-Dimethyl-2-imidazolidinone (DMI) is a cyclic urea used as a high-boiling polar aprotic solvent. It is colourless, highly polar solvent has high thermal and chemical stability. It is a homolog of the related solvent DMPU. It can be prepared from 1,2-dimethylethylenediamine by reaction with phosgene.

Solvent
DMI has excellent solvating ability for both inorganic and organic compounds. In many applications, DMI (as well as DMPU) can be used as a substitute or replacement for the carcinogenic solvent HMPA.

DMI is used in a variety of applications including detergents, dyestuffs, electronic materials and in the manufacture of polymers.

DMI is toxic in contact with skin.

References

Solvents
Amide solvents
Imidazolidinones